Euler's constant (sometimes also called the Euler–Mascheroni constant) is a mathematical constant usually denoted by the lowercase Greek letter gamma.

It is defined as the limiting difference between the harmonic series and the natural logarithm, denoted here by :

Here,  represents the floor function.

The numerical value of Euler's constant, to 50 decimal places, is:

History 
The constant first appeared in a 1734 paper by the Swiss mathematician Leonhard Euler, titled De Progressionibus harmonicis observationes (Eneström Index 43). The notation  appears nowhere in the writings of either Euler or Mascheroni, and was chosen at a later time perhaps because of the constant's connection to the gamma function. For example, the German mathematician Carl Anton Bretschneider used the notation  in 1835 and Augustus De Morgan used it in a textbook published in parts from 1836 to 1842.

Appearances 
Euler's constant appears, among other places, in the following (where '*' means that this entry contains an explicit equation):
 Expressions involving the exponential integral*
 The Laplace transform* of the natural logarithm
 The first term of the Laurent series expansion for the Riemann zeta function*, where it is the first of the Stieltjes constants*
 Calculations of the digamma function
 A product formula for the gamma function
 The asymptotic expansion of the gamma function for small arguments.
 An inequality for Euler's totient function
 The growth rate of the divisor function
 In dimensional regularization of Feynman diagrams in quantum field theory
 The calculation of the Meissel–Mertens constant
 The third of Mertens' theorems*
 Solution of the second kind to Bessel's equation
 In the regularization/renormalization of the harmonic series as a finite value
 The mean of the Gumbel distribution
 The information entropy of the Weibull and Lévy distributions, and, implicitly, of the chi-squared distribution for one or two degrees of freedom.
 The answer to the coupon collector's problem*
 In some formulations of Zipf's law
 A definition of the cosine integral*
 Lower bounds to a prime gap
 An upper bound on Shannon entropy in quantum information theory
 Fisher–Orr model for genetics of adaptation in evolutionary biology

Properties 
The number  has not been proved algebraic or transcendental. In fact, it is not even known whether  is irrational. Using a continued fraction analysis, Papanikolaou showed in 1997 that if  is rational, its denominator must be greater than 10244663. The ubiquity of  revealed by the large number of equations below makes the irrationality of  a major open question in mathematics.

However, some progress was made. In 2009 Alexander Aptekarev proved that at least one of Euler's constant  and the Euler–Gompertz constant  is irrational; Tanguy Rivoal proved in 2012 that at least one of them is transcendental. In 2010 M. Ram Murty and N. Saradha showed that at most one of the numbers of the form

In 2013 M. Ram Murty and A. Zaytseva found a different family containing , which is based on sums of reciprocals of integers not divisible by a fixed list of primes, with the same property.

Relation to gamma function 
 is related to the digamma function , and hence the derivative of the gamma function , when both functions are evaluated at 1. Thus:

This is equal to the limits:

Further limit results are:

A limit related to the beta function (expressed in terms of gamma functions) is

Relation to the zeta function 
 can also be expressed as an infinite sum whose terms involve the Riemann zeta function evaluated at positive integers:

Other series related to the zeta function include:

As a result, the formula is well-suited for efficient computation of the constant to high precision.

Other interesting limits equaling Euler's constant are the antisymmetric limit:

and the following formula, established in 1898 by de la Vallée-Poussin:

where  are ceiling brackets.

Closely related to this is the rational zeta series expression. By taking separately the first few terms of the series above, one obtains an estimate for the classical series limit:

where  is the Hurwitz zeta function. The sum in this equation involves the harmonic numbers, . Expanding some of the terms in the Hurwitz zeta function gives:

where 

 can also be expressed as follows where  is the Glaisher–Kinkelin constant:

 can also be expressed as follows, which can be proven by expressing the zeta function as a Laurent series:

Integrals 
 equals the value of a number of definite integrals:

where  is the fractional harmonic number.

The third formula in the integral list can be proved in the following way:
 

Definite integrals in which  appears include:

One can express  using a special case of Hadjicostas's formula as a double integral with equivalent series:

An interesting comparison by Sondow is the double integral and alternating series

It shows that  may be thought of as an "alternating Euler constant".

The two constants are also related by the pair of series

We also have Catalan's 1875 integral

Series expansions 
In general, 

for any . In particular,  exhibits much more rapid convergence than the conventional expansion . This is because

while

Even so, there exist other series expansions which converge more rapidly than this; some of these are discussed below.

Euler showed that the following infinite series approaches :

In 1910, Vacca found the closely related series

In 1926 he found a second series:

From the Malmsten–Kummer expansion for the logarithm of the gamma function we get:

An important expansion for Euler's constant is due to Fontana and Mascheroni

where  are Gregory coefficients This series is the special case  of the expansions

convergent for 

A similar series with the Cauchy numbers of the second kind  is 

Blagouchine (2018) found an interesting generalisation of the Fontana–Mascheroni series

where  are the Bernoulli polynomials of the second kind, which are defined by the generating function
 
For any rational  this series contains rational terms only.
 
Other series with the same polynomials include these examples:
 
and
 
where  is the gamma function.

A series related to the Akiyama–Tanigawa algorithm is
 
where  are the Gregory coefficients of the second order.
  
Series of prime numbers:

Asymptotic expansions 
 equals the following asymptotic formulas (where  is the th harmonic number):
 (Euler)
 (Negoi)
 (Cesàro)
The third formula is also called the Ramanujan expansion.

Alabdulmohsin derived closed-form expressions for the sums of errors of these approximations. He showed that (Theorem A.1):

Exponential 
The constant  is important in number theory.

This restates the third of Mertens' theorems.
.

Other infinite products relating to  include:

These products result from the Barnes -function.

In addition,

where the th factor is the th root of

This infinite product, first discovered by Ser in 1926, was rediscovered by Sondow using hypergeometric functions.

It also holds that

Continued fraction
The continued fraction expansion of  begins , which has no apparent pattern. The continued fraction is known to have at least 475,006 terms, and it has infinitely many terms if and only if  is irrational.

Generalizations

Euler's generalized constants are given by

This can be further generalized to

for some arbitrary decreasing function . For example,

gives rise to the Stieltjes constants, and

gives

where again the limit

appears.

A two-dimensional limit generalization is the Masser–Gramain constant.

Euler–Lehmer constants are given by summation of inverses of numbers in a common
modulo class:

The basic properties are

and if  then

Published digits
Euler initially calculated the constant's value to 6 decimal places. In 1781, he calculated it to 16 decimal places. Mascheroni attempted to calculate the constant to 32 decimal places, but made errors in the 20th–22nd and 31st-32nd decimal places; starting from the 20th digit, he calculated ...1811209008239 when the correct value is ...0651209008240.

References 
 
 
 

Footnotes

Further reading 
  Derives  as sums over Riemann zeta functions.
 
 
 
 
 
 
 
 
 
 
 
  with an Appendix by Sergey Zlobin

External links 
 
 
 Jonathan Sondow.
 Fast Algorithms and the FEE Method, E.A. Karatsuba (2005)
 Further formulae which make use of the constant: Gourdon and Sebah (2004).

Mathematical constants
Unsolved problems in number theory
Leonhard Euler